Mohanpur Government Girls High School is a government school in Mohanpur Upazila of Rajshahi District, Bangladesh. It was nationalized in 1987.

Classes
The school provides education from Class 6 to 10 (SSC). It has one shift, which starts from 7:30 in the morning.

References

High schools in Bangladesh
Girls' schools in Bangladesh